Dapelgo, or similar variants, is the name of several settlements in Burkina Faso. It may refer to:
 Dapelogo, Dapélogo, the capital of Dapélogo Department
 Dapelgo, Gounghin, a village in Gounghin Department
 Dapélgo, Binde, a village in Bindé Department